Rufus Roy McCain (July 7, 1903 – December 3, 1940) was a prisoner at Alcatraz who attempted escape with Henri Young and Arthur Barker in 1939.

Attempt
On the night of January 13, 1939, McCain, with Young, Barker, and two other men, attempted escape from the Rock. The guards started to fire shots at Arthur Barker. Barker eventually died and the others were recaptured. McCain and Young were sentenced to almost 22 months each in solitary confinement.

After Young and McCain returned to the normal prison population, McCain was assigned to the tailoring shop and Young to the furniture shop located directly upstairs.

Death
On December 3, 1940, Young waited until just after the  count to run downstairs and stab McCain with a sharpened spoon. McCain fell quickly into shock and died five hours later. Young refused to disclose his motive for the murder.

References

External links 
 Alcatraz: Rigid and Unusual Punishment

1903 births
1940 deaths
American escapees
Escapees from United States federal government detention
Inmates of Alcatraz Federal Penitentiary
American people who died in prison custody
Deaths by stabbing in California
Prisoners who died in United States federal government detention
Prisoners murdered in custody